Prays oleae (olive moth) is a moth of the family Plutellidae found in Europe.

Description

The larvae are a pest on olives (Olea europaea). Other recorded food plants include Phillyrea, jasmine and Ligustrum. They mine the leaves of their host plant which initially consists of an upper-surface, short, narrow corridor.

Distribution
The moth is found in Southern Europe (the Mediterranean region) and North Africa. It was first found in Great Britain at a garden centre in Surrey in 2009 and has since been found at a light trap in Kent.

Gallery

References

Plutellidae
Leaf miners
Moths described in 1788
Moths of Africa
Moths of Europe
Moths of the Middle East
Lepidoptera of Namibia
Moths of Asia